The House of the New York City Bar Association, located at 42 West 44th Street in Manhattan, New York, is a New York City Landmark building that has housed the New York City Bar Association since its construction in 1896.

History

After the New York City Bar Association was founded in 1870, it housed itself in a series of buildings in lower Manhattan. By the 1890s, membership of the Association had grown to the point where its leadership began looking for a new House farther uptown. On December 11, 1894 the membership approved the acquisition of a large site between West 43rd and West 44th Streets for the construction of a new, larger building. The street, already home to the Harvard Club of New York and the Century Association, was considered by the members “specially adapted to our purposes” because of the other prominent clubs and societies in its vicinity.

The prominent architect Cyrus L.W. Eidlitz, son of the influential New York architect Leopold Eidlitz, was commissioned to design the building. Eidlitz had designed a number of landmark buildings throughout the country, including Dearborn Station in Chicago, Buffalo & Erie County Public Library, St. Peter's Church in the Bronx, and Bell Laboratories Building in Manhattan.

Construction was begun in early 1895 and completed 18 months later at a total cost of $584,700. The House was built in the neoclassical style, from Indiana limestone. The façade included elements of the Doric order on the bottom three floors, Ionic columns framing the fourth floor windows, and Corinthian pilasters on the fifth floor, creating a historicist “composite” of classical architecture.

The new House was considerably larger and grander than its precursors: it stood six stories tall; included a meeting hall with a seating capacity of 1,500; a reception hall with a standing capacity of 1,500; a library of over 50,000 volumes, and three additional floors of offices. The entrance hall and first floor stairways were constructed of marble, and the second floor hallway, reception hall, and meeting hall of granite, marble, and mahogany.

The Association opened the doors of its new House on October 8, 1896, with a gala of several thousand guests. The New York Times described it as “one of the most interesting and successful works of recent architecture…a work having the classical qualities of simplicity, purity, and serenity in a high degree.” 

The House was named a New York City Landmark in 1966, and named to the National Register of Historic Places in 1980.

Gallery

See also
 Architecture of New York City
 List of New York City Designated Landmarks in Manhattan from 14th to 59th Streets
 National Register of Historic Places listings in New York County, New York

References
Notes

Bibliography
“The House of the Association.” New York, NY: The New York City Bar Association. October 8, 1996.
 Martin, George. Causes and Conflicts: The Centennial History of the Association of the Bar of the City of New York. New York, NY: Fordham University Press, 1997. 
New York City Bar Association Building History

External links

Office buildings completed in 1896
Office buildings on the National Register of Historic Places in Manhattan
Neoclassical architecture in New York City
New York City Designated Landmarks in Manhattan
Midtown Manhattan